Peter Russell-Clarke (born 19 September 1935) is an Australian chef, cookbook writer, illustrator and media personality

Biography
Clarke is best known for his television cooking shows. He hosted a five-minute television show called Come and Get It, which aired on the Australian Broadcasting Corporation for nine years during the 1980s, broadcasting over 900 episodes. He frequently used the Aussie greeting G'day at the start of segments of Come and Get It.

He was chef for the Prince of Wales' Silver Jubilee dinner.

He has written and published several cookbooks and books about food. He has also illustrated several books, including works of fiction for children. Russell-Clarke is an accomplished painter, and began his career as a freelance cartoonist.

In the period 1975–79 Russell-Clarke was the spokesman in several highly successful and much discussed campaigns on behalf of the Victorian Egg Board and the Australian Dairy Corporation. Victorian egg sales rose 5% in three years.

Selected publications
New Idea Cookbook (Southdown Press) 
The Awful Australian 'arry (John Walker Publications, 1969) (by Robert King Crawford; illustrated by Peter Russell-Clarke)
The World is Flat: An Authentic Misrepresentation of Australian History (1972)  (by Robert King Crawford ; illustrated by Peter Russell-Clarke)
Getting Across: A Guide to Good Speaking and Writing (Edward Arnold [Australia], 1978)  (by Maurice Brown; drawings by Peter Russell-Clarke)
Peter Russell-Clarke's Egg Cook Book (Schwartz, 1979) 
Peter Russell-Clarke's Come and Get It Cookbook: The Book of the TV Series (Macmillan, 1984) 
Peter Russell-Clarke's Freshwater Trout Cookbook (Pan Macmillan Australia, January 1985)
Peter Russell-Clarke's Honey Cookbook (Sun Papermac, 1985) 
Come and Get it Again: More Fresh and Easy Recipes From the TV Show (Australian Broadcasting Commission, January 1987) 
Food, the Dictionary (Sun Books, 1985)  (written and illustrated by Peter Russell-Clarke)
Aussie Outdoor Cookbook: In Association with the Australian Red Cross (Lothian, 1998) 
Pie of the Day (Lothian Books, October 1998) 
The Magic of Lemons (Information Australia, 2000) 
Magic of Olive Oil (Information Australia, 2001) 
Food Encyclopedia: Everything You Need to Know About Every Food (BAS Publishing, December 2005) 
The Adventures of Harry Lombard: The Magic Suitcase (Jellisen Publishing Australia, 2005)  (by Michael Krape; drawings by Peter Russell-Clarke)
Waltzing Matilda (Alto Books, 2008)  (by A.B. Banjo Paterson; illustrator, Peter Russell-Clarke)

Notes

External links
Official site

Australian television chefs
Australian television presenters
Douglas Wilkie Medal winners
Living people
1935 births
People from Ballarat